Black Lion Records was a British jazz record company and label based in London, England.

Alan Bates founded Black Lion Records in 1968. The label had two series of releases, one for British jazz musicians and one for international musicians. It released a large amount of reissue material, including items by Art Tatum, Jay McShann, Ben Webster, Earl Hines, Bud Freeman, Bud Powell, Don Byas, Coleman Hawkins, Mal Waldron, and Duke Ellington. It had a subsidiary called Freedom Records, which concentrated on free jazz releases; this wing was bought by Arista Records in 1975.

The label was distributed by Polydor for part of its existence. It became part of D. A. Music in the 1980s, while Bates bought Candid Records in 1989 and shifted the focus of his activities there.

Discography

References

British record labels
Jazz record labels
British jazz record labels